Out of the Black may refer to:

Out of the Black (Boys Noize album), 2012
Out of the Black (The Stranglers album), 2002
Out of the Black (EP), by Royal Blood, 2014
"Out of the Black" (song), the title song
Out of the Black (film), an American film of 2001